Brno is a city in the South Moravian Region of the Czech Republic. Located at the confluence of the Svitava and Svratka rivers, Brno has about 380,000 inhabitants, making it the second-largest city in the Czech Republic after the capital, Prague, and one of the 100 largest cities of the EU. The Brno metropolitan area has almost 700,000 inhabitants.

Brno is the former capital city of Moravia and the political and cultural hub of the South Moravian Region. It is the centre of the Czech judiciary, with the seats of the Constitutional Court, the Supreme Court, the Supreme Administrative Court, and the Supreme Public Prosecutor's Office, and a number of state authorities, including the Ombudsman, and the Office for the Protection of Competition. Brno is also an important centre of higher education, with 33 faculties belonging to 13 institutes of higher education and about 89,000 students.

Brno Exhibition Centre is among the largest exhibition centres in Europe. The complex opened in 1928 and established the tradition of large exhibitions and trade fairs held in Brno. Brno hosts motorbike and other races on the Masaryk Circuit, a tradition established in 1930, of which the Road Racing World Championship Grand Prix is one of the most prestigious races. Another cultural tradition is an international fireworks competition, Ignis Brunensis, which attracts tens of thousands of visitors to each display.

The most visited sights of the city include the Špilberk Castle and fortress and the Cathedral of Saints Peter and Paul on Petrov hill, two medieval buildings that dominate the cityscape and are often depicted as its traditional symbols. The other large preserved castle near the city is Veveří Castle by Brno Reservoir. Another architectural monument of Brno is the functionalist Villa Tugendhat, which was added to the UNESCO list of World Heritage Sites in 2001. One of the natural sights nearby is the Moravian Karst. The city is a member of the UNESCO Creative Cities Network and was designated a "City of Music" in 2017.

Names
The etymology of the name Brno is disputed. It might be derived from the Old Czech  'muddy, swampy.' Alternative derivations are a Slavic verb brniti (to armour or to fortify) or a Celtic language spoken in the area before it was overrun by Germanic peoples and later Slavic peoples. The latter theory would make it cognate with other Celtic words for hill, such as the Welsh word .

The city was also referred to as Brunn in English, but that usage is not common today.

The asteroid 2889 Brno was named after the city, as was the Bren light machine gun (Brno + Enfield), one of the most famous weapons of World War II.

History

The Brno basin has been inhabited since prehistoric times, but the town's direct predecessor was a fortified settlement of the Great Moravian Empire known as Staré Zámky, which was inhabited from the Neolithic Age until the early 11th century.

In the early 11th century Brno was established as a castle of a non-ruling prince from the House of Přemyslid, and Brno became one of the centres of Moravia along with Olomouc and Znojmo. Brno was first mentioned in Cosmas' Chronica Boëmorum dated to the year 1091, when Bohemian king Vratislav II besieged his brother Conrad at Brno castle.

In the mid 11th century, Moravia was divided into three separate territories; each had its own ruler, coming from the Přemyslids dynasty, but independent of the other two, and subordinate only to the Bohemian ruler in Prague. The seats of these rulers and thus the "capitals" of these territories were the castles and towns of Brno, Olomouc, and Znojmo. In the late 12th century, Moravia began to reunify, forming the Margraviate of Moravia. From then until the mid of the 17th century, it was not clear which town should be the capital of Moravia. Political power was divided between Brno and Olomouc, but Znojmo also played an important role. The Moravian Diet, the Moravian Land Tables, and the Moravian Land Court were all seated in both cities at once. However, Brno was the official seat of the Moravian Margraves (rulers of Moravia), and later its geographical position closer to Vienna also became important. Otherwise, until 1642 Olomouc had a larger population than Brno, and was the seat of the only Roman Catholic diocese in Moravia.

In 1243 Brno was granted the large and small city privileges by the King, and was thus recognized as a royal city. As throughout Eastern Central Europe, the granting of city privileges was connected with immigration from German-speaking lands. In 1324 Queen Elisabeth Richeza of Poland founded the Basilica of the Assumption of Our Lady, which now houses her grave. In the 14th century, Brno became one of the centres for the Moravian regional assemblies, whose meetings alternated between Brno and Olomouc. These assemblies made political, legal, and financial decisions. Brno and Olomouc were also the seats of the Land Court and the Moravian Land Tables, thus they were the two most important cities in Moravia. From the mid 14th century to the early 15th century, Špilberk Castle had served as the permanent seat of the Margraves of Moravia; one of them was elected the King of the Romans. Brno was besieged in 1428 and again in 1430 by the Hussites during the Hussite Wars. Both attempts to conquer the city failed.

17th century

In 1641, during the Thirty Years' War, the Holy Roman Emperor and Margrave of Moravia Ferdinand III ordered the permanent relocation of the diet, court, and the land tables from Olomouc to Brno, as Olomouc's Collegium Nordicum made it one of the primary targets of Swedish armies. In 1642 Olomouc surrendered to the Swedish Army, which occupied it for eight years. Meanwhile, Brno, as the only Moravian city which, under the leadership of Jean-Louis Raduit de Souches, succeeded in defending itself from the Swedes under General Lennart Torstenson, served as the sole capital of the Margraviate of Moravia. After the end of the Thirty Years' War in 1648, Brno retained its status as the sole capital. This was later confirmed by the Holy Roman Emperor Joseph II in 1782, and again in 1849 by the Moravian constitution. Today, the Moravian Land Tables are stored in the Moravian Regional Archive, and are included among the national cultural sights of the Czech Republic.

During the 17th century Špilberk Castle was rebuilt as a huge baroque citadel. Brno was besieged by the Prussian Army in 1742 under the leadership of Frederick the Great, but the siege was ultimately unsuccessful. In 1777 the bishopric of Brno was established by the Catholic Church; Mathias Franz Graf von Chorinsky Freiherr von Ledske was the first Bishop.

19th century
In December 1805 the Battle of Austerlitz was fought near the city; the battle is also known as the "Battle of the Three Emperors". Brno itself was not involved with the battle, but the French Emperor Napoleon Bonaparte spent several nights here at that time, and again in 1809.

In 1839 the first train arrived in Brno from Vienna; this was the beginning of rail transport in what is now the Czech Republic. In the years 1859–1864 the city fortifications were almost completely removed. In 1869 a horsecar service started to operate in Brno, the first tram service in what would later become the Czech Republic.

Gregor Mendel conducted his groundbreaking experiments in genetics while he was a monk at St. Thomas's Abbey in Brno in the 1850s.

20th century and Greater Brno

Around 1900 Brno, which consisted in administrative terms only of the central city area until 1918, had a predominantly German-speaking population (63%), as opposed to the suburbs, which were predominantly Czech-speaking. Life in the city was therefore bilingual, and what was called in German "Brünnerisch" was a mixed idiom containing elements from both languages.

In 1919, after World War I, two neighbouring towns, Královo Pole and Husovice, and 21 other municipalities were annexed to Brno, creating Greater Brno. This was done to dilute the German-speaking majority of close to 55,000 by the addition of the Czech communities of the city's neighborhood. Included in the German-speaking group were almost all of the 12,000 Jewish inhabitants, including several of the city's better known personalities, who made a substantial contribution to the city's cultural life. Greater Brno was almost seven times larger, with a population of about 222,000 – before that Brno had about 130,000 inhabitants.

In 1921 Brno became the capital of the Land of Moravia (Czech: země Moravská). Seven years later, Brno became the capital of the Land of Moravia-Silesia (Czech: země Moravskoslezská).

In 1930, 200,000 inhabitants declared themselves to be of Czech, and some 52,000 of German nationality, in both cases including the respective Jewish citizens.

During the German occupation of the Czech lands between 1939 and 1945, all Czech universities were closed by the Nazis, including those in Brno. The Faculty of Law became the headquarters of the Gestapo, and the university hall of residence was used as a prison. About 35,000 Czechs and some American and British prisoners of war were imprisoned and tortured there; about 800 civilians were executed or died. Executions were public. The Nazis also operated a subcamp of the Auschwitz concentration camp, which held mostly Polish prisoners, an internment camp for Romani people in the city, and a forced labour "education" camp in the present-day district of Dvorska.

Between 1941 and 1942, transports from Brno deported 10,081 Jews to Theresienstadt (Terezín) concentration camp. At least another 960 people, mostly of mixed race, followed in 1943 and 1944. After Terezín, many of them were sent to Auschwitz concentration camp, Minsk Ghetto, Rejowiec and other ghettos and concentration camps. Although Terezín was not an extermination camp, 995 people transported from Brno died there. Only 1,033 people returned after the war.

Industrial facilities such as the Československá zbrojovka arms factory and the Zweigwerk aircraft engine factory (which became Zbrojovka's subsidiary Zetor after the war) and the city centre were targeted by several Allied bombardment campaigns between 1944 and 1945. The air strikes and later artillery fire killed some 1,200 people and destroyed 1,278 buildings. After the city's occupation by the Red Army on 26 April 1945 and the end of the war, ethnic German residents were expelled. In the Brno death march, beginning on 31 May 1945, about 27,000 German inhabitants of Brno were marched  to the Austrian border. According to testimony collected by German sources, about 5,200 of them died during the march. Later estimates by Czech sources put the death toll at about 1,700, with most deaths due to an epidemic of shigellosis.

After the reestablishment of an independent Czechoslovak state after World War II, Prime Minister Edvard Beneš delivered a speech in Brno demanding the expulsion of Germans from Czechoslovakia. Shortly afterwards, 20,000 ethnic Germans from the city were expelled into Allied-occupied Austria. After the 1948 Czechoslovak coup d'état, the Czechoslovak Socialist Republic abolished Moravian autonomy and Brno thus ceased to be the capital of Moravia. Since then Moravia has been divided into administrative regions, with Brno the administrative centre of the South Moravian Region.

In 1960s and 1970s, large panel housing estates were built in border districts, such as Bohunice, Líšeň, Bystrc and Vinohrady. During the communist era, most of the workforce was employed in industry, mainly machinery.

After 1989, part of the workforce switched from industry to services, and Brno became the IT centre of the Czech Republic. Nevertheless, new industrial zones were built at the edge of the city, such as Černovická terasa in the east of the city.

Geography

Brno is located in the southeastern part of the Czech Republic, at the confluence of the Svitava and Svratka rivers, and there are also several brooks flowing through it, including the Veverka, Ponávka, and Říčka. Brno is situated at the crossroads of ancient trade routes which have joined northern and southern European civilizations for centuries, and is a part of the Danube basin region.

Within the city limits are the Brno Reservoir, several ponds, and other standing bodies of water, such as the reservoirs in the Marian Valley and the Žebětín Pond. Due to its location between the Bohemian-Moravian Highlands and the Southern Moravian lowlands (Dyje-Svratka Vale), Brno has a moderate climate. Compared to other cities in the country, Brno has a very high air quality, which is ensured by a good natural circulation of air; no severe storms or similar natural disasters have ever been recorded in the city.

Climate
Under the Köppen climate classification, Brno has an oceanic climate (Cfb) for −3 °C original isoterm, but near of the (−2.5 °C average temperature in January, month most cold) or include by updated classification in humid continental climate (Dfb) with cold winters and warm to hot summers. However, in the last 20 years the temperature has increased, and summer days with temperature above  are quite common. The weather box below shows average data between years 1961 and 1990. 
The highest peak in the municipal area is the Kopeček Hill, and the highest point overall lies in Útěchov on the border with the municipality of Vranov.

Cityscape

Administration

Legally, Brno is a statutory city, consisting of 29 administrative divisions known as city districts. The highest body of self-government is the Brno City Assembly. The city is headed by the lord mayor, who has the right to use the mayor's insignia and represents the city externally. As of 2021, the lord mayor is Markéta Vaňková of the Civic Democratic Party (ODS). The executive body is the city council and local councils of the city districts; the city council has 11 members including the lord mayor and her four deputies. The assembly of the city elects the lord mayor and other members of the city council, establishes the local police, and is also entitled to grant citizenship of honour and the Awards of the City of Brno. The head of the Assembly of the City of Brno in personal matters is the Chief Executive, who according to certain special regulations carries out the function of employer of the other members of the city management. The Chief Executive is directly responsible to the Lord Mayor.

The city itself forms a separate district, the Brno-City District, surrounded by the Brno-Country District. Brno is divided into 29 administrative divisions (city districts) and consists of 48 cadastral areas. The "Brno-City District" and "Brno-Country District" are not to be confused with the "city districts" of Brno.

The city districts of Brno vary widely in their size by both population and area. The most populated city district of Brno is Brno-Centre, which has over 91,000 residents, and the least populated are Brno-Ořešín and Brno-Útěchov, with about 500 residents. By area, the largest district is Brno-Bystrc and the smallest is Brno-Nový Lískovec.

Brno is the home to the highest courts in the Czech judiciary. The Supreme Court is on Burešova Street, the Supreme Administrative Court is on Moravské náměstí, the Constitutional Court is on Joštova Street, and the Supreme Public Prosecutor's Office of the Czech Republic is on Jezuitská street.

Demographics

According to the 2011 census, Brno had 385,913 inhabitants. The largest ethnic groups reported (without options to choose between) were Czechs (51.6%), Moravians (18.7%), Slovaks (1.5%), Ukrainians (0.9%), Vietnamese (0.4%), and Poles (0.2%). 23.7% of inhabitants did not write any nationality. In the 2001 census, when the most common nationalities were list to choose between, 76.1% were Czechs and 18.7% Moravians (94.8% Czechs in the broader sense).

Brno experienced its largest increases in population during the 19th century at the time of the Industrial Revolution, and in 1919 due to a merger with surrounding municipalities.

Culture

The city spends about 30 million euro every year on culture. A vibrant university city with about 90,000 students, Brno is home to many museums, theatres and other cultural institutions, and also hosts a number of festivals and other cultural events.

Since the 1990s Brno has experienced a great cultural "rebirth": façades of historical monuments are being repaired and various exhibitions, shows, etc., are being established or extended. In 2007 a summit of 15 presidents of EU Member States was held in Brno.

Despite its urban character, some of the city districts still preserve traditional Moravian folklore, including folk festivals with traditional Moravian costumes, Moravian wines, folk music and dances. Unlike smaller municipalities, in Brno annual traditional Moravian folk festivals are held in several city districts, including Židenice, Líšeň, and Ivanovice.

Hantec is a unique slang that originated in Brno.

Sights

Brno has hundreds of historical sights, including one designated a World Heritage Site by UNESCO, and eight monuments listed among the national cultural heritage of the Czech Republic. Most of the main sights of Brno are situated in the historical centre. The city has the third largest historic preservation zone in the Czech Republic, the largest one being in the Czech capital Prague. However, there is a considerable difference in the number of historical preservation zones of both cities. While Brno has 484 legally protected sites, Prague has as many as 1,330.

Špilberk Castle, originally a royal castle founded in the 13th century, was from the 17th century a fortress and feared prison (e.g. Carbonari). Today it is one of the city's principal monuments.

Another key landmark is the Cathedral of St. Peter and Paul, built during the 14th and 15th centuries in place of an 11th-century chapel. Its present form with two neo-Gothic towers was completed in 1909. The other large castle near the city is Veveří Castle.

The Abbey of Saint Thomas was the site of Gregor Mendel's experiments establishing the new science of genetics. The Church of Saint Tomas houses the tomb of its founder, John Henry and his son Jobst of Moravia, Margraves of Moravia. The Basilica of the Assumption of Our Lady houses the grave of its founder Queen Elisabeth Richeza. The Church of Saint James is one of the best preserved and most spectacular Gothic churches in Brno.

Brno Ossuary is the second largest ossuary in Europe, after the Catacombs of Paris. Another ossuary is the Capuchin crypt, with mummies of Capuchin monks and some of the notable people of their era, including architect Mořic Grimm and the mercenary leader Baron Trenk. The Labyrinth under Zelný trh, a system of underground corridors and cellars dating back to the Middle Ages, has been recently opened to the public. These cellars have been used mainly for storing food, maturing beer and wine, and as wartime shelters. Originally, they were not interconnected as they are now – this happened later during the reconstruction in 2009.

Brno is home to a functionalist Synagogue and the largest Jewish cemetery in Moravia. A Jewish population lived in Brno as early as the 13th century, and remnants of tombstones can be traced back to as early as 1349. The functionalist synagogue was built between 1934 and 1936. While the Brno Jewish community numbered 12,000 in 1938, only 1,000 survived Nazi persecution during Germany's occupation in World War II. Today, the cemetery and synagogue are again maintained by a Brno Jewish community. The only Czech mosque, founded in 1998, is also located in Brno.

The era between the world wars saw a building boom to the city, leaving it with many modern and especially functionalist buildings, the most celebrated being Villa Tugendhat, designed by architect Ludwig Mies van der Rohe in the 1920s for the wealthy family of Fritz Tugendhat, and finished in 1930. It was designated a World Heritage Site by UNESCO in 2001. Another renowned architect who significantly shaped Brno was Arnošt Wiesner. Other functionalist buildings include the Avion Hotel and Morava Palace. The Brno Exhibition Centre is the city's main attraction for international business visitors, visited by over one million visitors each year, and hosting over 40 professional trade fairs and business conferences.

Lužánky is the oldest public park in the Czech Republic, established in the late 18th century by the emperor of the Austro-Hungarian Empire. Denis Gardens were founded in the early 19th century and were the first public park in the present-day Czech Republic founded by public authorities. Špilberk Park is classified as a national cultural sight of the Czech Republic, as a unique piece of landscape architecture.

One of Brno's more recent additions is the Brno astronomical clock.

Festivals

The biggest festival in Brno is the fireworks competition festival, Ignis Brunensis (Latin for "Flame of Brno"), held annually in June, part of the "Brno - City in the Centre of Europe" festival. Ignis Brunensis is the biggest show of its kind in Central Europe, usually attracting 100,000-200,000 visitors to each display.

The international film festival Cinema Mundi screens about 60 films competing for Oscar nomination in the category of Best Foreign Language Film.

Theatre World Brno is another international festival held annually in the city, in which Brno theatres and the city centre stage around 100 performances by national and foreign ensembles.

Other festivals held regularly in Brno include the International Music Festival Brno, the Spilberk International Music Festival, and the Summer Shakespeare Festival.

Every September, Brno hosts a wine festival, Slavnosti vína, to celebrate the harvest in the surrounding wine-producing region.

Theatres

Brno has a long theatre tradition. Brno has the oldest theatre building in Central Europe, the Reduta Theatre on Zelný trh. The first theatre plays in Brno probably took place in the 1660s in the City Tavern, today's Reduta Theatre; however, the first theatre with boxes was built in this complex in 1733. The first documented professional Czech performance took place in 1767, again in the Reduta Theatre; the play was called Zamilovaný ponocný and was performed by the Venice Theatre Company. The same year, Mozart performed in the theatre with his elder sister Anna Maria (Nannerl). In that year the Mozart family spent Christmas in Brno, and their visit is commemorated by a statue of Mozart as a child in front of the Reduta Theatre. The theatre's Mozart Hall was also named after him.

The Národní divadlo v Brně (NdB) is the leading producer of opera, drama and ballet in the city of Brno. The first permanent seat of NdB was established in 1884, and today this institution owns the Mahen Theatre, built in 1882, Janáček Theatre, built in 1965, and the Reduta Theatre. The composer Leoš Janáček is also connected with the National Theatre of Brno. The Mahen Theatre was the first theatre building in Europe to be illuminated by Thomas Edison's electric light bulbs; at that time it was a completely new invention and there were no power plants built in the city, so a small steam power plant was built nearby just to power the theatre, and Edison came to Brno in 1911 to see it.

The most commercially successful theatre in Brno is the Brno City Theatre, founded in 1945; its performances are usually sold out. They also stage about 150 performances abroad every year. The theatre's repertoire consists primarily of musical and dramatic shows.

There are a variety of smaller theatres in Brno, including Divadlo Bolka Polívky, Divadlo Husa na provázku, HaDivadlo, loutkové divadlo Radost, Divadlo Polárka, G Studio, Divadlo v 7 a půl – Kabinet múz, and Divadlo Vaňkovka children's theatre.

The Mahen Theatre was originally called the City Theatre, and until 1918 it performed exclusively in German and was not part of the National Theatre of Brno. Between 1971 and 1978, some plays were performed at the Brno Exhibition Centre due to reconstruction of the Mahen Theatre.

Local legends

There are several legends connected with the City of Brno. One of the best known is the Legend of the Brno Dragon. It is said that there was a terrible creature terrorizing the citizens of Brno. The people had never seen such a beast before, so they called it a dragon. They lived in fear of the dragon until a brave man managed to kill the monster by tricking it into eating a carcass filled with lime. In reality the dragon was a crocodile, the preserved body of which is now displayed at the entrance of the Old Town Hall. Crocodile and dragon motifs are common in Brno. A crocodile is the local stuffed baguette, and the city radio station is known as Radio Krokodýl. The local baseball team is named Draci Brno and the local rugby club is named RC Dragon Brno. There is also a local American football team called the Brno Alligators. An Intercity train connecting Brno and Prague is called Brněnský drak.

Next to the "dragon" at the Old Town Hall is the town's second well-known emblem, a wagon wheel made from a tree found and cut down 50 miles from the city. According to the legend, a local man made a wager that he could fell the tree, make a wheel out of it, and roll the wheel to the City of Brno, all within a single day. Since the achievement was deemed to be impossible by normal human means, the man was believed to have called on the devil for assistance, and died in poverty as a result.

Another local legend relates to the siege of the city by Swedish forces in 1645. The locals and the Swedish army were in a stalemate, and the Swedish general declared that he would withdraw if his army had not won by noon. The bell ringer at Petrov Cathedral tricked him by ringing the bell an hour early, and keeping his word, the general and his army left. As a historic tribute to the event, the bell at Petrov Cathedral still rings for noon an hour earlier, at 11 o'clock. At this time, the Brno astronomical clock also releases a glass ball as a souvenir.

Museums, libraries, and galleries

The most significant museum in Brno is the Moravian Museum, the largest museum in Moravia and the second largest in the Czech Republic. The museum was founded in 1817 and its collections include over 6 million pieces. The biggest public library in Brno is the Moravian Library, the second largest library in the Czech Republic with around 4 million volumes. The biggest gallery in Brno is the Moravian Gallery, again the second largest institution of its kind in the Czech Republic and the biggest in Moravia. One section of the Moravian Museum, the Anthropos Pavilion, is related to the oldest history of mankind and prehistoric Europe.

Brno also has a Technical Museum, the largest in Moravia and one of the largest in Czech Republic. The permanent exhibitions chart the advance of science and technology, accompanied by various lifelike models and restored machines. The museum also hosts short-term exhibitions of many different points of interest.

In 2016 the Vašulka Kitchen Brno (VKB) was established in Brno for research, artistic experiment and informal education in the field of new media art. Housed in the Brno House of Arts, it consists of the archive of Steina and Woody Vasulka’ work and presents a permanent exhibition of their selected works.

Education

Over the past two decades Brno has evolved into an important university city; the number of students at Brno's higher education institutions reached 89,000 in 2010. The city has also become home to a number of institutions directly related to research and development, including the Central European Institute of Technology (CEITEC), and the International Clinical Research Center (ICRC). The city is also gaining importance in various fields of engineering, especially in software development. Companies operating in Brno include AVG Technologies (headquarters), IBM (Client Innovation Centre), AT&T, Honeywell (Global Design Center), Siemens, SGI (Czech headquarters), Red Hat (Czech headquarters), and Motorola.

With over 40,000 students, Masaryk University is the largest university in Brno and the second biggest in the Czech Republic. Today, it consists of nine faculties, with more than 190 departments, institutes and clinics.

The Brno University of Technology was established in 1899, and is now among the biggest technical universities in the Czech Republic with over 20,000 students. Viktor Kaplan, inventor of the Kaplan turbine, spent nearly 30 years at the German Technical University in Brno, which ceased to exist in 1945, its property transferred to Brno University of Technology.

Mendel University, named after the founder of genetics Gregor Mendel, who developed his revolutionary scientific theories in Brno, has roughly 10,000 students.

Janáček Academy of Music and Performing Arts, named after Leoš Janáček, was founded in 1947 and is one of two academies of music and drama in the Czech Republic. It holds the annual Leoš Janáček Competition.

Sports

The city has a long association with motor racing; among other events, the Masaryk Circuit has hosted the Moto GP championship since 1965. The annual Czech Republic motorcycle Grand Prix, the most famous motor race in the Czech Republic, has been held in the city since 1950. Since 1968, Brno has been a permanent fixture on the European Touring Car Championship (ETCC) series.

Track and road cycling have a long history in Brno. The first track races took place here in 1889, and the velodrome in Brno ranks among the oldest velodromes in the world. In 1969 Brno hosted the UCI Track Cycling World Championships and UCI Road World Championships for amateurs, in 1981 the UCI Track Cycling World Championships and in 2001 the UEC European Track Championships for the U23 category. There are two traditional cycling teams: TJ Favorit Brno and Dukla Brno.

The 2010 FIBA World Championship for Women was played in Brno's Arena Vodova, with the Czech squad taking the silver medal.

There is a horse-race course at Brno-Dvorská and an aeroclub airport in Medlánky. Several sports clubs represent the city in the various Czech leagues, including FC Zbrojovka Brno (football), HC Kometa Brno (ice hockey), KP Brno (handball), BC Brno (basketball, men) and BK Brno (women), four baseball teams (Draci Brno, Hroši Brno, VSK Technika Brno, MZLU Express Brno), Brno Ravens Lacrosse Club (lacrosse), Brno Alligators (American football), two rugby teams (RC Dragon Brno, RC Bystrc) and others. Tennis players Barbora Krejčíková, Lucie Šafářová, Lukáš Rosol, and Jana Novotná are from Brno, as well as Michal Březina, one of the top Czech figure skaters.

Transport

Public transport in Brno consists of 12 tram lines, 14 trolleybus lines (the largest trolleybus network in the Czech Republic) and almost 40 day and 11 night bus lines. Trams (known locally as šaliny) first appeared on the streets in 1869; this was the first operation of horse-drawn trams in the modern-day Czech Republic. The local public transport system is interconnected with regional public transport in one integrated system (IDS JMK), and directly connects several nearby municipalities with the city. Its main operator is the Brno City Transport Company (DPmB), which also operates a mostly recreational ferry route at the Brno Dam Lake. A tourist minibus provides a brief tour of the city. In 2011, the city announced plans to build a metro system light rail system to alleviate overcrowding of trams and to reduce congestion on the surface.

Railway transport began operating in the city in 1839 on the Brno–Vienna line, the first operating railway line in the modern-day Czech Republic. Today, Brno is a transnational railway hub, with nine stations for passenger traffic. The current main railway station is the central hub of regional train services, used by about 50,000 passengers every day, with around 500 trains passing through. The station is currently operating at full capacity; the main station building is outdated and lacks sufficient operating capacity, but the construction of the new station has been postponed several times for various reasons. A referendum over whether to move the station was held on 7 and 8 October 2016, coinciding with regional elections.

Brno is also an international road transport crossroads. There are two motorways on the southern edge of the city: the D1 leading to Ostrava and Prague, and the D2 leading to Bratislava. Not far from the city limits is the D52 motorway leading to Vienna. Another planned motorway, the D43, will connect Brno to northwestern Moravia. The city is gradually building the large city ring road (road I/42). Several road tunnels have been built at Pisarky, Husovice, Hlinky and Královo pole, and more are planned. Due to the congestion in private transport, the city is continuing to try to build more parking ramps, including underground, but these efforts have not always been successful.

Air transport is enabled by two functional airports. The public international airport, Brno-Tuřany Airport, saw a sharp increase in passenger traffic up to 2011, however the number of passengers declined in the following years, especially during the COVID-19 pandemic. The airport also serves as one of the two bases for police helicopters in the Czech Republic. The other airport, Medlánky Airport, is a small domestic airport serving mainly recreational activities such as flying hot air balloons, gliders or aircraft RC models.

Cycling is widespread in Brno due to lowland nature of the landscape. Several hiking trails of the Czech Tourist Club also pass through Brno.

Notable people

Gregor Mendel (1822–1884), scientist; lived and died in Brno
Ernst Mach (1838–1916), physicist, philosopher
Maria Neruda (1840–1920), violinist
Ludwig Strakosch (1855–1919), operatic baritone
Adolf Loos (1870–1933), architect
Erich Wolfgang Korngold (1897–1957), composer, conductor
Ladislav Vácha (1899–1943), gymnast
Hugo Haas (1901–1968), actor, director
Jan Gajdoš (1903–1945), gymnast
Georg Placzek (1905–1955), physicist
Kurt Gödel (1906–1978), philosopher, mathematician, physicist
Bohumil Hrabal (1914–1997), author
Vítězslava Kaprálová (1915–1940), composer, conductor
Zvi Dershowitz (born 1928), American rabbi
Milan Kundera (born 1929), author
Woody Vasulka (1937–2019), Czech-American artist
Rudolf Potsch (born 1937), ice hockey player
Jiří Daler (born 1940), cyclist
Lubo Kristek (born 1943), artist
Jiří Pospíšil (1950–2019), basketball player
Jan Stejskal (born 1962), footballer
Roman Kukleta (1964–2011), footballer
Robert Kron (born 1967), ice hockey player 
Jana Novotná (1968–2017), tennis player 
Jaromír Blažek (born 1972), footballer
Magdalena Kožená (born 1973), opera singer
Libor Zábranský (born 1973), ice hockey player and coach
David Kostelecký (born 1975), sports shooter
Adam Svoboda (1978–2019), ice hockey player
Miroslava Knapková (born 1980), rower
Jan Polák (born 1981), footballer
Lucie Šafářová (born 1987), tennis player 
Karel Abraham (born 1990), motorcycle racer
Jiří Procházka (born 1992), mixed martial artist; lives in Brno
Adam Ondra (born 1993), rock climber
Nicole Melichar (born 1993), American tennis player
Barbora Krejčíková (born 1995), tennis player

International relations

Twin towns – sister cities
Brno is twinned with:

 Bratislava, Slovakia
 Dallas, United States
 Debrecen, Hungary
 Kaunas, Lithuania
 Kharkiv, Ukraine
 Leeds, England, United Kingdom
 Leipzig, Germany
 Poznań, Poland
 Rennes, France
 Sankt Pölten, Austria
 Stuttgart, Germany

Cooperation agreements
Brno also cooperates with:
 Daejeon, South Korea
 Lviv, Ukraine – twinning approved in 2022
 Utrecht, Netherlands
 Vienna, Austria

Nearby cities

Gallery

See also
List of people from Brno
Churches of Brno
National Theatre (Brno)

Notes

References

Bibliography

Filip, Aleš (2006). Brno - city guide. Brno: K-Public.  
Gödel, Alois (2006). " Brünn 1679-1684", Brno: ITEM. 
Procházka, Jiří.(2008)." 1683. Vienna obsessa. Brunna" Brno ITEM.

External links

Official website
Official tourist portal

 
Brno-City District
Cities and towns in the Czech Republic